Ione Jean Christensen, née Cameron (born October 10, 1933) is a former Canadian Senator.

The daughter of former North-West Mounted Police constable Gordon Irwin Cameron, and Dawson City born Martha Ballentine Cameron, her family moved to Whitehorse in 1949. Christensen graduated from high school in 1953. She received an associate in arts degree in business administration from the College of San Mateo in California. In 1968, she married Art Christensen, a geologist.

In 1971, she was appointed the first woman justice of the peace and judge of the juvenile court in Yukon. In 1975, she was elected the first woman mayor of Whitehorse; on the same day, Yolanda Burkhard was elected as the first woman mayor of Dawson City. In 1979, she served as the commissioner of Yukon, being the first woman to be appointed as commissioner.

In 1980, she ran unsuccessfully as a Liberal candidate, in the federal election for the riding of Yukon. She lost by 101 votes to Erik Nielsen.

In 1994, she was appointed a Member of the Order of Canada. Her father was also a member. In 1999, Christensen was appointed at the recommendation of Prime Minister Jean Chrétien to the Senate.

On December 31, 2006, Christensen resigned from the Senate to assist her ailing husband.

In 2019, she was made a member of the Order of Yukon's inaugural class. The first 10 recipients were named ahead of the ceremony on December 2, 2019.

References

1933 births
Living people
Canadian senators from Yukon
Canadian people of Norwegian descent
Commissioners of Yukon
Liberal Party of Canada senators
Members of the Order of Canada
Members of the Order of Yukon
Mayors of Whitehorse
Women members of the Senate of Canada
Candidates in the 1980 Canadian federal election
People from Dawson Creek
Women mayors of places in Yukon
20th-century Canadian women politicians
21st-century Canadian politicians
21st-century Canadian women politicians
Canadian justices of the peace
Liberal Party of Canada candidates for the Canadian House of Commons